Bharatiya Janata Party, or simply, BJP is the affiliate of Bharatiya Janata Party for the state of Jharkhand. Its head office is situated at the M-7, Harmu Housing Colony, Ranchi. Deepak Prakash was appointed as the State President of the Jharkhand unit on 25 February 2020.

Electoral history

Legislative Assembly election

Lok Sabha election

Leadership

Chief Minister

Deputy Chief Minister

Leader of the Opposition

President

See also
 Bharatiya Janata Party, Gujarat
 Bharatiya Janata Party, Uttar Pradesh
 Bharatiya Janata Party, Madhya Pradesh
 State units of the Bharatiya Janata Party

References 

Bharatiya Janata Party
Politics of Jharkhand
Jharkhand